CSIT may refer to:

Education
Carleton School of Information Technology
Center for Information Security Technologies
Chhatrapati Shivaji Institute of Technology

Cyber Security
The Centre for Secure Information Technologies (CSIT)

Computing
Computer Science  Information Technology

Other uses
Channel state information at the transmitter, wireless communication term
Coral Sea Islands Territory, an external territory of Australia
CSIT - International Workers and Amateurs in Sports Confederation